Risa Shiragaki  (born ) is a Japanese female volleyball player. She is part of the Japan women's national volleyball team.

She participated in the 2015 FIVB Volleyball World Grand Prix.
On club level she played for NEC Red Rockets in 2015.

References

1991 births
Living people
Japanese women's volleyball players
Place of birth missing (living people)